The Indonesian Choice Awards was an entertainment industry award given by the Indonesian television network, NET. to the artists in the world entertainment who have worked hard to win the hearts of the people of Indonesia, in conjunction with network's anniversary. Nominations were determined by a jury of people in the entertainment industry, and voting takes place by members of the public through social media. The show was first held on May 18, 2014 and held until its fifth edition in 2018.

Location and hosts

Categories

Music
Male Singer of the Year
Female Singer of the Year
Song of the Year
Album of the Year
Instrumental Album of The Year (2018-)
 Breakthrough Artist of the Year
 Group/Band/Duo of the Year
 Music Video of the Year (2017-)

Movies
 Movie of the Year
 Actor of the Year
 Actress of the Year

Television
 TV Program of the Year

Other
 Creative and Innovative Person of the Year (2016-)
 Digital Persona of the Year (2015)

Special award
 Lifetime Achievement Award

Nomination process
Nominations are made by a committee of members of MUSISI (Society For Indonesian Music). They consist of Dhani Pette, Adib Hidayat (Rolling Stone), Frans Sartono (Kompas), Qaris Tajudin (Tempo), Gilang AR (The chairman of the association MD Indonesia), Jan. Dhuhana (senior producer), Denny MR (senior music writer), Danni Satrio (Hai), Oppie Andaresta, and Piyu.

TV programs are nominated based on their quality, not their ratings, and the show must appear on a channel other than NET. This nomination is done for award's credibility.

See also

 List of Asian television awards

References

External links
 

 
Annual television shows
Awards established in 2014
2014 establishments in Indonesia
Indonesian music awards
Indonesian television awards